Catherine Walker (born 1975) is an Irish actress. She is notable for British and Irish television appearances including The Clinic (2003–2009), Northanger Abbey and Waking the Dead (2007), Bitter Sweet (2008), Lewis (2009), The Silence (2010), Strike Back (2013), Critical (2015), A Dark Song (2016) and The Curse of Audrey Earnshaw (2020). More recently, she appeared as Madame Scarron/Madame de Maintenon in series 2 and 3 of the TV series Versailles. She also appeared as Alice Brooks in Series 5 of the BBC drama Shetland. In 2020, she appeared for 3 episodes in the Netflix series Cursed as the recurring character, Lenore, the mother to Nimue from the legends of King Arthur. She also had a minor role in the Ridley Scott directed House of Gucci, playing Anna Wintour, the editor-in-chief of Vogue.

She won the Irish Times Irish Theatre Award for Best Actress twice, for What Happened Bridgie Cleary by Tom MacIntyre at the Peacock Theatre and for The Talk of the Town at the Project Arts Centre in Dublin. The Talk of the Town was written by Irish novelist Emma Donoghue, whose best-selling novel Room was subsequently filmed by Lenny Abrahamson.

References

External links

1975 births
Living people
20th-century Irish actresses
21st-century Irish actresses
Actresses from Dublin (city)
Irish film actresses
Irish stage actresses
Irish television actresses